The 1924 College Basketball All-Southern Team consisted of basketball players from the South chosen at their respective positions.

All-Southerns

Guards
Monk McDonald, North Carolina (MB)
K. P. Gatchell, Mississippi A&M (MB)

Forwards
Jack Cobb, North Carolina (MB)
Cartwright Carmichael, North Carolina (MB)

Center
Slim Carter, Alabama (MB)

Key
MB = selected by Morgan Blake in the Atlanta Journal.

References

All-Southern